Buckton is a small village in Northumberland, North East England, located just over 5 km north of Belford.

Buckton consists of a farm and a few cottages. Buckton is the site of a medieval deserted village, which was first recorded in 1560, but had shrunk in size by the mid-18th century. The farmhouse dates from the 18th century and has a walled garden. The remains of a late medieval dovecote (Grade II listed) are located to the north of the farm. Buckton Burn flows close to the settlement.

Thomas Gregson, second premier of Tasmania, was born in Buckton.

References

Villages in Northumberland